Fire photography is the act of taking photographs of firefighting operations. People who practise this form of photography are called fire photographers.

Since fire photography involves being close to dangerous situations, fire photographers must have special skills and knowledge about emergency incident scenes, operations, health, and safety.  Fire photographers are often required to wear firefighter protective equipment.

Uses of fire photography
The work of fire photographers encompasses multiple applications. These include:
Investigation
Training
Fire prevention
Occupational health and safety
Post-incident analysis
Improvement of the public's view on emergency work
Strengthening of sense of belonging for firefighters

Involvement with fire departments
Fire photographers may or may not be directly employed by fire departments. They provide a specialized photography service which may involve a fee per photograph. Access to safety perimeters can be an issue for fire photographers, thus they usually develop good relationships with their local fire department to improve access to fire scenes.  Such access may, at the fire department's discretion, require additional training or other arrangements. Large departments do often have professional photo service units, such as those in New York City and Chicago.

Certification
A formal fire photographer certification process is being drafted by the International Organization of Fire Photography.  The intent of this certification is to attest that an individual has sufficient training, skills and knowledge in relevant areas (health & safety, firefighting operations, etc.) to operate within a safe perimeter of an emergency incident scene.

See also
 Fire buff

References

External links
 International Fire Photographers Association archived
 Incident Response
 Fire Service Photography
 Connecticut Fire Photographers Association
 Southern California Fire Network

Firefighting
Photography by genre